Golden State is the fourth studio album by the British rock band Bush, released on 23 October 2001 through Atlantic Records. It is the last Bush album to feature Nigel Pulsford and Dave Parsons on guitar and bass, respectively. Bush would not release another studio album again until ten years later with The Sea of Memories. The liner notes of Golden State cite the album in memory of Ian Lowery, founder of Folk Devils. In the documentary Making Of Golden State, the title is revealed as being inspired by the Golden State Freeway, which Gavin Rossdale used to use to get home.

Production
When asked by Rolling Stone reporter Christina Saraceno what the band was trying to achieve with Golden State, Rossdale replied:

Rossdale also mentioned in an NY Rock interview that people would often have the clichéd idea that he is a dark, depressed person. To counteract this, he used the name Golden State because it sounded "warm and positive." Regarding the songs' positive theme, Rossdale noted "I'm far more relaxed and I guess that influenced the album quite a bit." The stripped down musical style was a result of the band practicing all the songs five weeks before recording. This voided the use of industrial elements as heard on The Science of Things. And as a final test, Rossdale played the songs through a "shitty" car stereo to make sure they recorded well.

Nigel Pulsford later expressed disappointment at the final mix of the album:

Music 
The music of Golden State is held to be a resurrection of the sound of the band's 1994 debut album, Sixteen Stone. Rossdale commented that he felt the band were "coming back full-circle" with the record, after a near decade together, further proclaiming Golden State to be "a real rock record" with a sound he felt was "very naked" and "empowering and uplifting".

Promotion
The album's original cover featured an outline of a passenger airliner. Following the September 11, 2001 attacks, the band changed the artwork to something more minimal. The album's lead single, "The People That We Love," was originally titled "Speed Kills" (which appeared on advance promo copies and early radio promos advertising the song), but it was renamed for the same reason, after being listed as an inappropriate song by Clear Channel Communications. Regarding the name change, the band posted this message on their website:

The song "Headful of Ghosts" also featured a lyric change when performed live, substituting the word terrorist for maverick, for the same reason.

Upon release, "The People That We Love" saw significant radio play as well as heavy rotation of its music video on MTV2. However, compared to earlier Bush hits, it has since been virtually forgotten on radio. A follow up single was not released in the US, making this Bush's final American single for 9 years until reunited in 2010 with the single 'Afterlife'. In the UK, "Inflatable" was released as a single with an accompanying video.

Golden State was released by Atlantic Records, which originally distributed Sixteen Stone.  Bush co-hosted the 22 October 2001 edition of Channel One News to promote the album and give away an autographed copy, an act which critics of the educational program derided.

Critical reception

Golden State received mostly positive reviews from music critics. At Metacritic, where they assign a "weighted average" rating out of 100 to selected independent ratings and reviews from mainstream critics, the album received a Metascore of a 63, based on 11 reviews, indicating "Generally favorable reviews."

Stephen Thomas Erlewine of AllMusic gave a mainly positive review, considering Bush "comfortable and powerful, rocking hard" and to be "turning out songs that are not only catchy, but that hold together and cohere over the course of an album." Erlewine complemented the band's return to their 1994 sound, giving the view that Golden State sounded "charmingly retro".

Kerrang! lauded Golden State as "Bush's best album yet."

Jenny Eliscu of Rolling Stone was, however, more dismissive, commenting "Today, the group could be criticized for imitating itself... Gavin Rossdale's delicious rasp is still unequivocally sexy, but his melodies are rote versions of the same old song." She added  "Nothing here hits the inevitable, almost scientific heights the band reached with anthems like 'Everything Zen' or 'Glycerine.' As it is, Golden State has only a few bright spots."

Track listing
All songs written by Gavin Rossdale

Song appearances in other media
"The People That We Love" was included on the Need for Speed: Hot Pursuit 2 soundtrack and was originally to be included in Need For Speed: Carbon. "Solutions" was used in the soundtrack for Swimfan and was played in the background during the party scene. "Inflatable" was used in the first season Smallville episode "Leech". "Out of This World" was featured in the Buffy the Vampire Slayer episode "Dead Things".
Bush performed "The People That We Love" on 3 Degrees of Clones (2001)

Personnel

Bush
 Gavin Rossdale – lead vocals, rhythm guitar
 Nigel Pulsford – lead guitar, backing vocals
 Dave Parsons - bass
 Robin Goodridge – drums

Additional musicians
 Paul Eastman – piano
 Jamie Muhoberac – keyboards
 Eric Stefani – piano

Technical personnel
 Bush – production
 Pete Black – photography
 Billy Bowers – editing
 Greg Fidelman – engineer
 Paul Foley – editing
 Lorraine Francis – assistant engineer
 G – art direction
 Bon Harris – programming
 Stephen Marcussen – mastering
 Dennis Morris – photography
 Dave Sardy – mixing, production, sonics
 Stewart Whitmore – mastering

Chart performance

Album

Singles

References

External links
Bush Fansite

Bush (British band) albums
2001 albums
Albums produced by Dave Sardy
Atlantic Records albums
Albums recorded at Olympic Sound Studios